Mayaponera is a genus of ants in the subfamily Ponerinae. It contains the single species Mayaponera constricta, found in Central and South America. Workers are slender and medium in size (6–7.5 mm).

References

Ponerinae
Monotypic ant genera
Hymenoptera of North America
Hymenoptera of South America